Chetana Jagrati Punj (established on 19 August 2009) is a welfare society which is working for agriculture, art and culture, education and literacy, and environment and forests. Its state office is in Aligarh, Uttar Pradesh.

Aim and objects
Animal husbandry, dairying and fisheries, aged/elderly, agriculture, art and culture, biotechnology, children, civic issues, differently abled, disaster management, Dalit upliftment, drinking water, education and literacy, environment and forests, food processing, health and family welfare, HIV/AIDS, human rights, information and communication technology, legal awareness and aid, labour and employment, microfinance, minority issues, new and renewable energy, nutrition, panchayati raj.

Executive committee details:
President:                    Mr. Rajesh Chauhan (Mob 9997526458)
General Secretary:            Mr. Wasim Ahmed
Treasurer:                    Mr. Rajkumar Sharma
Member:                       Mrs. Archna
Member:                       Mr. Nilendra Singh
Member:                       Mr. Mohisin Ali
Member:                       Mr. Riyajuddin

Head office
A-11, Okhala, Jamiya Nagar, New Delhi-110025

Patron
Film star Dhananjay Singh also known as :Dharam ji" is a patron.

References

Organisations based in Uttar Pradesh
Aligarh
2009 establishments in Uttar Pradesh
Organizations established in 2009